The 9th Street Art Exhibition of Paintings and Sculpture is the official title artist Franz Kline hand-lettered onto the poster he designed for the Ninth Street Show (May 21-June 10, 1951). Now considered historic, the artist-led exhibition marked the formal debut of Abstract Expressionism, and the first American art movement with international influence. The School of Paris, long the headquarters of the global art market, typically launched new movements, so there was both financial and cultural fall-out when all the excitement was suddenly emanating from New York. The post-war New York avant-garde, artists like Willem de Kooning and Jackson Pollock, would soon become "art stars," commanding large sums and international attention. The Ninth Street Show marked their "stepping-out," and that of nearly 75 other artists, including Harry Jackson, Helen Frankenthaler, Joan Mitchell, Grace Hartigan, Robert De Niro Sr., Philip Guston, Elaine de Kooning, Lee Krasner, Franz Kline, Ad Reinhardt, David Smith, Milton Resnick, Joop Sanders, Robert Motherwell, Barnett Newman and many others who were then mostly unknown to an art establishment that ignored experimental art without a ready market.

The artist-led show was intended to make names — and it did. Word of the exhibition slipped out prior to the Monday night preview, but that only added to the interest. Author Mary Gabriel writes, "Nothing sold, but no one cared. The exhibition had earned the artists attention on their own terms." Their form of art — the New York School — was later called "the quintessential American and modern art movement." At the time, however, "[i]t appeared as though a line had been crossed, a step into a larger art world whose future was bright with possibility."

Organization

The Club 
During the late 1940s and early 1950s, dozens of painters and sculptors all had art studios in lower Manhattan between 8th and 12th streets and First and Sixth Avenues. Collectively known as the Downtown Group, many of them were former Federal Art Project artists, including Philip Pavia, Bill de Kooning, Landes Lewitin, Franz Kline and Jack Tworkov. Several had also served in the military during World War II.

In 1949, members of the Downtown Group, helmed by Philip Pavia, created a more structured group that met regularly on 39 East 8th Street, and came to be known as "The Club." Weekly discussions at the Club led to the idea of organizing the 9th Street Art Exhibition as a launching pad.

The Artists 
"Since few of them had ever received any significant notice," the New Yorker's Claudia Roth Pierpont writes, describing both the artists and the exhibition's selection process, "the rush to participate was so intense that everyone was limited to a single piece. Even in this renegade atmosphere," she continues, "there was some initial discussion of whether including women in the exhibition would diminish its chance of being taken seriously. Eventually, the jury selected eleven women, and sixty-one men, to represent the creatively rich (if otherwise impoverished) new downtown art world, with its cheap industrial lofts, high communal spirits, and almost universal devotion to abstraction." Note, however, although 74 artists were exhibited, only 64 are listed below, which is sourced from Franz Kline's original poster.

By Representative work 
(Selection was limited by availability.)

By name 
(Source: 9th St. Art Exhibition poster, 1951)
L. Alcopley (1910–1992)
Rene Robert Bouche (1906–1963)  		
Theodore Brenson (1893–1959)
James Brooks (1906–1992)
Peter Busa (1914–1985)
Giorgio Cavallon (1904–1989)
Nicolas Carone (1917–2010)
Elaine de Kooning (1918–1989)
Willem de Kooning (1904–1997)
Robert De Niro, Sr. (1922–1993)
Enrico Donati (1909–2008)
Friedel Dzubas (1915–1994)
Jimmy Ernst (1920–1984)
Herbert Ferber (1906–1991)
John Ferren (1905–1970)
Perle Fine (1908–1988) 
Helen Frankenthaler (1928–2011)
Michael Goldberg (Stuart) (1924–2007)
Robert Goodnough (1917–2010)
Clement Greenberg (1909–1998)
Peter Grippe (1912–2002) 
Philip Guston (1913–1980)
Grace Hartigan (George) (1922–2008)
Hans Hofmann (1880–1966)
Harry Jackson (1924–2011)
Hugh Kappel (1910–1982)
Earl Kerkam (1891–1965)
Franz Kline (1910–1962)
Gitou Knoop (1909–1985)
Albert Kotin (1907–1980)
Lee Krasner (1908–1984)
Alfred Leslie (1927–2023)
Richard Lippold (1915–2002)
Seymour Lipton (1903–1986)
Conrad Marca-Relli (1913–2000)
Boris Margo (1902–1995)
George McNeil (1908–1995)
Joan Mitchell (1925–1992)
Robert Motherwell (1915–1991)
Costantino Nivola (1911–1988)
Jackson Pollock (1912–1956)
Fairfield Porter (1907–1975)
Richard Pousette-Dart (1916–1992)
Melville Price (1920–1970)
Ad Reinhardt (1913–1967)
Milton Resnick (1917–2004)
Robert Richenburg (1917–2006)
Robert Rauschenberg (1925–2008)
James Rosati (1912–1988) 
Anne Ryan (1889–1954)
Joop Sanders (1921–)
Louis Schanker (1903–1981)
Day Schnabel (1905–1991)
Sonia Sekula (1918–1963)
Aaron Siskind (1903-1991)
David Smith (1906–1965)
Theodoros Stamos (1922–1997)
Joe Stefanelli (1921–2017)
John Stephan (1906–1994)
Jean Steubing (1929–2019)
Yvonne Thomas (1913-2009)
Bradley Walker Tomlin (1899–1953)
Jack Tworkov (1900–1982)
Esteban Vicente (1903–2001)

By photo 
(Selection was limited by availability.)

Exhibition funding and formal roles 
"[R]ent for the decrepit [exhibition] space for the entire length of the show was only $70."Arts journalist Philip Barcio explains."But nearly everyone involved in the show was broke, and some were literally starving. [Future art dealer Leo] Castelli covered the bill, and the artists did all of the work to renovate ... the basement and first floor of a condemned building at 60 East 9th Street." Castelli, in his first curatorial effort, six years before he opened the gallery that made him famous, also hung the show. It was said he was selected because he was popular, and many of the artists thought he would hang their work impartially, but he also "paid for most of the expenses."

Prior to the show, artist Franz Kline designed and created of all of the promotional materials, including the poster that gave the show its official name. During the event, Aaron Siskind, also a New York School "member," documented the exhibit with a series of photographs. Afterward, "[t]he artists celebrated not only the appearance of the dealers, collectors and museum people on the 9th Street, and the consequent exposure of their work," Altshuler writes, "but they celebrated the creation and the strength of a living community."

Legacy

American art 
Critical response after the Ninth Street Show encouraged and helped define early abstract expressionism, while also promoting it. Critic Harold Rosenberg's "famous 1952 essay, 'The American Action Painters,' [which] effectively likened artists such as Willem de Kooning and Franz Kline to heroic existentialists wrestling with self-expression" is one good example. But praise from critics like the make-or-break "[Clement] Greenberg ... collectors like Peggy Guggenheim, and curators like MoMA’s Alfred H Barr ... [also helped] abstract expressionism eventually gain momentum among the art glitterati of New York in the 1950s, despite never being popular among the wider American public." It was Greenberg, in fact, who claimed that "for the first time ever, the most 'advanced' form of Western art was no longer being produced in Europe but instead in New York. For him, it was painters like Pollock, Motherwell, De Kooning, Rothko, Kline, and Newman that were now, thanks to the new abstract languages they were developing, carrying on the work that had begun with the European avant-gardes."

A less enthusiastic public, however, meant that few local galleries mounted shows featuring members of the group. The Stable Gallery, a converted horse stable, located at 924 7th Avenue and 58th Street in Manhattan, was an exception, and as host of the New York Painting and Sculpture Annuals from 1953–57, it exhibited some of the "Ninth Street Show" artists.

The poster for the second New York Painting and Sculpture Annual, also held at The Stable Gallery in 1953, included an introduction by critic Clement Greenberg, both crediting and praising the Ninth Street Show for setting a precedent for showing more daring work because the show was conceived and organized by artists:<blockquote>This exhibition was conceived and organized by artists, the event rightly to be considered the precedent for this one was the famous "Ninth Street" show held in the spring of 1951 on the ground floor of a vacated store, on East 9th St. Like this one, that exhibition was organized, and its participants named and invited, by artists themselves, and a range of the liveliest tendencies within the mainstream of advanced painting and sculpture was presented. I don't think the reverberations of that show have died away yet..."<ref>[http://albertkotin.com/stable1953.jpg Stable Gallery 1953 Poster’’] </ref></blockquote>

 Women artists 
Sixty-one men and eleven women participated in the Ninth Street Art Exhibition. "Five of the women went on to have international careers, their work collected by major museums and subject to ever-expanding bibliographies: Grace Hartigan, Helen Frankenthaler, Joan Mitchell, Elaine de Kooning (who was married to Willem), and [Lee] Krasner—the oldest of them but the last to bloom, coming into her own only after Pollock’s death, in 1956, a painful loss yet the start of a remarkably productive twenty-eight years of widowhood." In 2018, author Mary Gabriel published a collective biography of them, their work and their underacknowledged contributions to American art in the acclaimed Ninth Street Women: Lee Krasner, Elaine de Kooning, Grace Hartigan, Joan Mitchell, and Helen Frankenthaler: Five Painters and the Movement That Changed Modern Art. The best-selling book ignited interest in the underappreciated women of abstract expressionism and in women artists, generally.

On April 24, 2019, The Hollywood Reporter published an exclusive, reporting that Amazon Studios had optioned Gabriel's book for Amy Sherman-Palladino and Daniel Palladino to develop into a series.

The University of California, Los Angeles (UCLA) also developed an art history class called "Ninth Street Women: The Women of Abstract Expressionism," which assigned Gabriel's book as a text to the influential women artists in the 9th Street Show.

 Related exhibitions 

 In 2006, New York City's Findlay Fine Art Gallery had a well-researched exhibition honoring the lesser known artists that were included in the 9th Street Art Exhibition.
 In 2016, the Denver Art Museum opened "Women of Abstract Expressionism," featuring more than 50 major paintings by 1940s and 1950s women of abstract expressionism. 
 In 2016, Hauser Wirth & Schimmel, a gallery in Los Angeles, made its debut with “Revolution in the Making: Abstract Sculpture by Women, 1947–2016.” In a review of the Denver show, Hyperallergic'''s Yasmeen Siddiqui notes that "Women of Abstract Expressionism" Challenges the Canon But Is Only the Beginning.

External links

Articles 

 The Neighbors of Ninth Street, 2020

Posters 
9th St. Art Exhibition poster, 1951
Second Annual Exhibition of Painting and Sculpture, The Stable Gallery poster, 1953

Videos 
9th Street Art Exhibition-abstract expressionist artists reminisce
Beginning of the New York School 1950s-Abstract Expressionism of the 1950s
James Brooks Abstract Expressionism-New York School 1950s action painting
Nicolas Carone-Abstract Expressionism-Artist of the 9th St. Show
Perle Fine Abstract Expressionism-1950s New York action painter
Albert Kotin Abstract Expressionism 1950s-New York School 1950s action painting
Conrad Marca-Relli Abstract Expressionism 1950s-New York School collage-painter
Joe Stefanelli Abstract Expressionism 1950s-New York School 1950s

Notes and references

1951 in art
1951 in New York City
1950s in Manhattan
Abstract expressionism
Art exhibitions in the United States
Art in New York City
Contemporary art exhibitions
Cultural history of New York City
Culture of Manhattan
Events in New York City
Greenwich Village
June 1951 events in the United States
May 1951 events in the United States
Tourist attractions in Manhattan